Crawl is an EP by the Swedish death metal band Entombed. It was released in 1991 by Earache Records as an appetizer to the new album Clandestine. This EP featured Orvar Säfström from Nirvana 2002 on vocals.

Track listing
 "Crawl" – 5:32 
 "Forsaken" – 3:50 
 "Bitter Loss" – 3:55

References                 

Entombed (band) albums
1991 EPs
Albums with cover art by Dan Seagrave
Earache Records EPs